Kushtia Government Girls High School is a government owned girls' school for grades 3–10 situated in Kushtia Sadar Upazila, Kushtia District, Bangladesh. The EIIN number of this school is 117759. It was established in 1963. It has some co-curriculum activities with the British Council.

See also 
 Kushtia Zilla School

References 

Schools in Kushtia District
Organisations based in Kushtia District